Zhang Xiaorui (born March 5, 1976, in Tianjin) is a Chinese football manager and a former professional player He is the currently caretaker head coach for Chinese Super League club Shenzhen.

He used to play for Tianjin Teda, Alemannia Aachen, Shanghai Zobon and Shanghai Shenhua. His first management assignment was with third-tier club Tianjin Tuanbo New City where he was initially brought in as a player-manager before leaving the club at the end of the 2009 Chinese league season.

Club career

Early career
As with all the most promising young Chinese players Zhang Xiaorui would quickly be included in the short-lived Chinese national youth team program to study football abroad in Brazil for a five-year training programme sponsored by Jianlibao and called the Chinese Jianlibao Youth Football Team. After graduating through the Jianlibao Youth Team he would move to Tianjin Teda F.C. to start his professional football career. He would show his potential when he would quickly establish himself as an integral member of the team and would personally win the Young Player of the Year award at the end of the 1999 league season.

Alemannia Aachen
He would attract the interests of German side Alemannia Aachen and play in the 2. Fußball-Bundesliga during 2001 as part of a loan deal. He, however found it difficult to establish himself within the team and would only make five league appearances before he returned to Tianjin Teda F.C. His return to China however saw his performances fluctuate due to injury the club allowed him to leave at the end of the 2004 league season.

Move to Shanghai
Attempting to resurrect his career he would join Shanghai Zobon in 2005 where he showed some of the skill and consistency that was missing from his performances. By his next season with the club he had become an integral member of the team (now known as Shanghai United F.C.) and help them to a mid-table finish. The 2007 league season,  however saw Shanghai Shenhua merge with the club and Zhang Xiaorui would lose his place within the enlarged squad. In 2008, he was hired to be a player-manager of Chinese Yi League club Tianjin Tuanbo New City, where he would gradually move away from playing before he would officially retire as a player in 2009.

International career
Zhang Xiaorui was part of the Jianlibao Youth and Chinese U-20 team that studied abroad and were fast-tracked by the Chinese Head coach Qi Wusheng who included him in the squad in a friendly against USA on January 29, 1997, in a game that China won 2-1. After making his senior debut he would go on to play for the Chinese U-20 team that took part in the 1997 FIFA World Youth Championship and once the tournament finished he was one of several players that would graduate from the Chinese Jianlibao Youth Football Team to the senior team along with Li Jinyu, Li Tie and Sui Dongliang. He would go on to score his first goal against Bosnia-Herzegovina in a friendly on March 3, 1997, in a 3–0 win. After playing in several FIFA World Cup qualification games he was dropped from the team after China did not qualify. After several years out being dropped from international football Zhang Xiaorui would return to the senior team when the new Chinese Head coach Bora Milutinović would include him in the squads that were playing friendlies in preparation for the 2000 AFC Asian Cup, however once these ended the manager decided not to call him into the squad anymore.

Management career
In 2008 Zhang Xiaorui was hired to be a player-manager of Chinese Yi League club Tianjin Tuanbo New City. In his first season, he would guide the team to a second-place finish in the Southern Group and a place in the play-offs where they were unable to win promotion. He was sacked on 10 March 2010, with Belgian manager Patrick De Wilde taking charge. In November 2010 Zhang would join Tianjin Runyulong as the club's General manager and oversaw the club's takeover of second-tier football club Anhui Jiufang F.C. before leaving the club on January 5, 2012, to return to management with the Tianjin Teda U-19 team.

References

External links
Biography at Sina  (Chinese)

1976 births
Living people
Association football midfielders
Chinese footballers
Footballers from Tianjin
China international footballers
Chinese football managers
Tianjin Jinmen Tiger F.C. players
Chinese expatriate footballers
Alemannia Aachen players
Shanghai Shenhua F.C. players
Tianjin Tianhai F.C. players